Asio is a genus of typical owls, or true owls, in the family Strigidae. This group has representatives over most of the planet, and the short-eared owl is one of the most widespread of all bird species, breeding in Europe, Asia, North and South America, the Caribbean, Hawaii and the Galápagos Islands. Its geographic range extends to all continents except Antarctica and Australia.

These are medium-sized owls,  in length with  wingspans. They are long-winged and have the characteristic facial disc. The two northern species are partially migratory, moving south in winter from the northern parts of their range, or wandering nomadically in poor vole years in search of better food supplies. Tropical Asio owls are largely sedentary. These owls hunt over open fields or grasslands, taking mainly rodents, other small mammals and some birds.

Asio owls are mainly nocturnal, but short-eared owls are also crepuscular. Most species nest on the ground, but the long-eared owl (Asio otus) nests in the old stick nests of crows, ravens and magpies (family Corvidae) and various hawks.

Taxonomy
The genus Asio was introduced by the French zoologist Mathurin Jacques Brisson in 1760 with the long-eared owl (Asio otus) as the type species. The genus name is from asiō, the Latin name used by Pliny the Younger for a type of horned owl, the feather tufts on the head of these owls give the appearance of "ears" which is a defining characteristic.

Species
The genus contains the following nine species:
 Jamaican owl, Asio grammicus (formerly placed in Pseudoscops)
Striped owl, Asio clamator (formerly placed in Pseudoscops or Rhinoptynx)
Long-eared owl, Asio otus
 Abyssinian owl, Asio abyssinicus
 Madagascar owl, Asio madagascariensis
Stygian owl, Asio stygius
 Short-eared owl, Asio flammeus
 Marsh owl, Asio capensis
 Fearful owl, Asio solomonensis

Three fossil species are recognized:
  Asio brevipes (Glenns Ferry Late Pliocene of Hagerman, USA)
  Asio priscus (Late Pleistocene of San Miguel Island and Santa Rosa Island, USA)
  Asio ecuadoriensis (Late Pleistocene of Ecuador)

The supposed Late Eocene/Early Oligocene eared owl "Asio" henrici has been recognized as a member of the fossil barn-owl genus Selenornis. "Asio" pygmaeus (often misspelt pigmaeus) cannot be assigned to a genus without restudy of the material. "Asio" collongensis (Middle Miocene of Vieux-Collonges, France) is now placed in the genus Alasio.

References

 
Bird genera